Antiguraleus fusiformis is a species of sea snail, a marine gastropod mollusk in the family Mangeliidae.

Description
The length of the shell attains 6 mm, its diameter 3 mm.

Distribution
This species occurs off Ninety Mile Beach, North Island, New Zealand, at depths between 475–640 m.; also off  Chatham Islands and Cook Strait

References

 Dell, Richard Kenneth. The archibenthal mollusca of New Zealand. Dominion Museum, 1956.
 Powell, A.W.B. 1979: New Zealand Mollusca: Marine, Land and Freshwater Shells, Collins, Auckland (p. 239)
 Spencer, H.G., Marshall, B.A. & Willan, R.C. (2009). Checklist of New Zealand living Mollusca. pp 196–219. in: Gordon, D.P. (ed.) New Zealand inventory of biodiversity. Volume one. Kingdom Animalia: Radiata, Lophotrochozoa, Deuterostomia. Canterbury University Press, Christchurch.

External links
 
  Tucker, J.K. 2004 Catalog of recent and fossil turrids (Mollusca: Gastropoda). Zootaxa 682:1-1295.

fusiformis
Gastropods described in 1956
Gastropods of New Zealand